Coyuca de Benítez  is a city and seat of the municipality of Coyuca de Benítez, in the state of Guerrero, south-western Mexico.

See also
Luces en el Mar

References

Populated places in Guerrero